Irena Andrukaitienė (born 6 September 1948 in Vilnius) is a Lithuanian politician.  In 1990 she was among those who signed the Act of the Re-Establishment of the State of Lithuania.

References

1948 births
Living people
Vilnius University alumni
Lithuanian journalists
Lithuanian women journalists
Women members of the Seimas
Members of the Seimas
Signatories of the Act of the Re-Establishment of the State of Lithuania
20th-century Lithuanian women politicians
20th-century Lithuanian politicians